Barron County is a county located in the U.S. state of Wisconsin. As of the 2020 census, the population was 46,711. Its county seat is Barron. The county was created in 1859 and later organized in 1874.

History
The county was created in 1859 as Dallas County (named after Vice President George M. Dallas), with the county seat located at Barron. It was renamed Barron County on March 4, 1869. The county took the name Barron in honor of Wisconsin lawyer and  politician Henry D. Barron, who served as circuit judge of the Eleventh Judicial Circuit. Barron County was organized in 1874.  In the late 1800s and early 1900s a community of Russian immigrants moved to Barron County.

Geography

Adjacent counties

 Washburn County – north
 Sawyer County – northeast
 Rusk County – east
 Chippewa County – southeast
 Dunn County – south
 St. Croix County – southwest
 Polk County – west
 Burnett County – northwest

Major highways

  U.S. Highway 8
  U.S. Highway 53
  U.S. Highway 63
  Highway 25 (Wisconsin)
  Highway 48 (Wisconsin)

Railroads
Wisconsin Northern Railroad
Canadian National

Buses
List of intercity bus stops in Wisconsin

Airports
 KRPD - Rice Lake Regional Airport serves Barron County.
 KUBE - Cumberland Municipal Airport is located three miles south of Cumberland.
 Y23 - Chetek Municipal–Southworth Airport also serves the county and surrounding communities.
 9Y7 - Barron Municipal Airport enhances county service.

Demographics

2020 census
As of the census of 2020, the population was 46,711. The racial makeup of the county was 91.1% White, 1.8% Black or African American, 1.0% Native American, 0.7% Asian, 1.2% from other races, and 4.2% from two or more races. Ethnically, the population was 2.7% Hispanic or Latino of any race.

2000 census

As of the census of 2000, there were 44,963 people, 17,851 households, and 12,352 families residing in the county.  The population density was 52 people per square mile (20/km2). There were 20,969 housing units at an average density of 24 per square mile (9/km2). The racial makeup of the county was 97.69% White, 0.14% Black or African American, 0.81% Native American, 0.32% Asian, 0.04% Pacific Islander, 0.32% from other races, and 0.69% from two or more races. 0.96% of the population were Hispanic or Latino of any race. 34.4% were of German, 21.8% Norwegian and 5.3% Irish ancestry.

There were 17,851 households, out of which 31.30% had children under the age of 18 living with them, 56.90% were married couples living together, 8.20% had a female householder with no husband present, and 30.80% were non-families. 25.40% of all households were made up of individuals, and 12.20% had someone living alone who was 65 years of age or older. The average household size was 2.48 and the average family size was 2.97.

In the county, the population was spread out, with 25.30% under the age of 18, 8.10% from 18 to 24, 26.80% from 25 to 44, 23.40% from 45 to 64, and 16.40% who were 65 years of age or older. The median age was 39 years. For every 100 females there were 98.20 males. For every 100 females age 18 and over, there were 96.00 males.

In 2017, there were 504 births, giving a general fertility rate of 70.6 births per 1000 women aged 15–44, the 15th highest rate out of all 72 Wisconsin counties. Additionally, there were fewer than five reported induced abortions performed on women of Barron County residence in 2017.

Politics

See also
 National Register of Historic Places listings in Barron County, Wisconsin
List of counties in Wisconsin

References

Further reading
 Curtiss-Wedge, Franklin. (comp.) History of Barron County Wisconsin. Minneapolis: H. C. Cooper Jr., 1922.

External links

 Barron County website
 Barron County map from the Wisconsin Department of Transportation

 
1874 establishments in Wisconsin
Populated places established in 1874